The Sobuj Bangla class is a class of inshore patrol vessel (IPV) family of the Bangladesh Coast Guard built in three batches. This class is a subclass of the Padma-class patrol vessel with similar design but less displacement and different armaments.

History
Sobuj Bangla-class ships are constructed at Dockyard and Engineering Works Limited. Their design and construction is supported by China Shipbuilding Trading Company (CSTC). They were ordered as part of the Bangladesh government's plan for expansion of the Bangladesh Coast Guard.

The contract for the first two ships were signed in 2015. They were laid down on 21 April 2015. The first ship, Sobuj Bangla was launched on 1 December 2016. The ships were handed over to the Bangladesh Coast Guard on 1 August 2018 and commissioned on 15 November 2020.

On 17 July 2016, Khulna Shipyard was awarded the contract for the construction of three patrol vessels with similar specifications of the first batch for the Bangladesh Coast Guard. The ships were handed over to the Bangladesh Coast Guard on 20 June, 2019 and commissioned on 15 November 2020.

Design
They have a complement of 45. They can carry out operations in sea state four and can sustain up to sea state six.

Armament
The patrol crafts are armed with two Oerlikon KBA 25 mm guns and two 14.5 mm guns.

Ships in class

See also
 List of ships of the Bangladesh Coast Guard

References